Hinterland is a Canadian indie pop band from Vancouver. Hinterland's music is best described as dream pop/shoegazing/new wave with soaring, ethereal vocals, and is currently released by Submerged Records. Hinterland's second album The Picture Plane (released February 2006) spent three months in the Canadian college radio top 50. Hinterland's debut album Under the Waterline won the band several Georgia Straight Music Awards, including best local album, best vocalist, and most underrated band. Hinterland has been featured on MuchMusic and CBC Television's ZeD.

Hinterland has shared the stage with artists such as Monade, the Album Leaf, Brendan Benson, Silversun Pickups, The Hermit, Paper Moon, and A Northern Chorus, and has performed across Canada, hitting cities such as Victoria, Calgary, Edmonton, Regina, Winnipeg, and Toronto.

Two of the members who wrote and performed on Under the Waterline and The Picture Plane are no longer with the band. Kyle Fogden left before the latter album was released, to be replaced by Greg Williams. Cameron McLellan left the band in the summer of 2006; his spot was filled by Robb Johannes.

Hinterland's third album Pan Pan Medico was released in February 2008.

In 2008, Hinterland members John Lucas and Michaela Galloway started a new project called The Hope Slide. The duo released a self-titled album in 2010, and are currently working on an album to be released in 2014.

Members
Michaela Galloway: vocals, flute, oboe, keys, percussion
Robb Johannes: bass, guitar
John Lucas: guitar, baritone guitar, bass
Gregg Steffensen: drums, percussion, noise
Greg Williams: guitar, keys

Former members
John Bews: bass
Kyle Fogden: guitar, keyboards, bass
Cameron McLellan: bass, guitar

Discography
 (2003) masstransfer issue 6 - Magazine with compilation CD featuring the song "Tiger Tiger"
 (2003) Under the Waterline
 (2005) Never Lose That Feeling - Compilation featuring Hinterland cover of Lush's "For Love"
 (2006) The Picture Plane
 (2006) One Cool Word issue 2 - Magazine with compilation CD featuring the song "Exit Signs"
 (2008) Pan Pan Medico

References

External links
Hinterland at Myspace
Hinterland at Bandcamp

Musical groups established in 2002
Musical groups from Vancouver
Canadian indie pop groups
Dream pop musical groups
Canadian shoegaze musical groups
Post-punk revival music groups
2002 establishments in British Columbia